Axis & Allies Naval Miniatures: War At Sea is a standalone miniature wargame, produced by Wizards of the Coast. Axis and Allies Naval Miniatures gameplay is similar to that of its sister game, Axis & Allies Miniatures, but the player takes command of Ships, Submarines, and squadrons of Aircraft.

Releases

Starters 
 War at Sea Starter Set: Released on March 16, 2007; It includes 9 randomized units, 2 double-sided battle maps, 6 island cards, and 8 six-sided dice.
 War at Sea Starter (Revised): Released on March 16, 2010; It includes 8 non-random miniatures, 2 double-sided battle maps, 4 six-sided dice and a new rule book.

Series 
 War at Sea: Set of 64 models, released on March 16, 2007. It features ships, submarines and aircraft from the UK, US, France, Australia, Germany, Italy and Japan.
 Task Force: Set of 60 models, released on July 25, 2008. Added Canadian and Dutch warships.
 Flank Speed: Set of 40 models, released on September 1, 2009. Introduces Soviet and New Zealander warships.
 Condition Zebra: Set of 40 models, released on June 8, 2010. Introduces Greek and Finnish warships.
 Fleet Command (usually known as Set V): Set of 39 models, released on December 7, 2010. Introduces Polish and Swedish warships.
 Surface Action: Set of 40 models, released on October 24, 2011.

Rules
War at Sea uses fairly simple rules. The players can get quickly familiarized with the Quick Start Guide and then continue with the Advanced Rules.

The advanced rules have been periodically updated, beginning in July 2007, with the Clarifications Document. The update introduces new concepts (such as ASW harassment and strafing penalties) not present in the original rules. Since at least one unit of the Task Force expansion set directly refers to these new rules, they are implicitly considered as part of the core ruleset, despite only having been published online to date.

There are some companies and blog sites that offer other ideas for Battles, advanced rules and tactics as well.

Errata
An official FAQ for the Task Force set can be found online.. It addresses errata such as misprints and ambiguously worded rules for the Task Force expansion. Further errata are contained in the Clarifications Document. Only additional unacknowledged errata are listed here:

 The correct name of the Dutch submarine is HNLMS Zwaardvisch, not Zvaardvisch.
 The Focke-Wulf Fw 200 reconnaissance plane was nicknamed "Condor", not "Kondor".
 In the War at Sea base set and the Flank Speed expansion, the colors of the Italian roundel were inverted. The roundel in Task Force was correct. (This error is partially acknowledged in the Clarifications Document.)
Both are  heavy cruisers of the same series and are considered sister ships.
Yamashiro should have the third turret pointing towards the stern. Fusōs third turret points toward the bow.
 The  miniature is actually that of her modernized sister ship , and not the unmodernized HMS Repulse.
 Some  miniatures have the island installed backwards.
 Some  miniatures have no island installed.

Units (through Surface Action)
  Australia
  (Fleet Command; Cruiser; Rare)
  (Task Force; Destroyer; Common)
  (War at Sea; Cruiser; Rare)
  (War at Sea Starter; Destroyer; Common)
  (War at Sea; Cruiser; Uncommon)

 Canada
  (Surface Action; Destroyer; Common)
  (Task Force; Destroyer; Common)
  (Flank Speed; Corvette; Common)
  (Fleet Command; Destroyer; Common)
  (Condition Zebra; Cruiser; Uncommon)

 Finland
 B-239 Buffalo (Fleet Command; Fighter; Common)
  (Condition Zebra; Coast Defense Ship; Uncommon)

  France
  (Fleet Command; Cruiser; Rare)
  (Condition Zebra; Aircraft Carrier; Rare)
  (Task Force; Submarine; Common)
 Dewoitine D.520 (Condition Zebra; Fighter; Common)
  (Task Force; Battleship; Rare)
  (Task Force; Battleship; Rare)
  (War at Sea; Light Cruiser; Uncommon)
  (Condition Zebra; Cruiser; Uncommon)
  (Flank Speed; Destroyer; Common)
  (Surface Action; Battleship; Rare)
  (Condition Zebra; Battleship; Rare)
  (War at Sea; Battleship; Rare)
  (Flank Speed; Cruiser; Rare)
  (War at Sea; Destroyer; Common)
 V.156 Vindicator (Condition Zebra; Torpedo Plane; Common)

  Germany
  (War at Sea; Pocket Battleship; Rare)
  (Task Force; Cruiser; Rare)
  (Task Force; Pocket Battleship; Rare)
  (Fleet Command; Merchant Cruiser Raider; Uncommon)
 Bf 109 (Task Force; Fighter; Common)
  (War at Sea; Battleship; Rare)
  (Fleet Command; Cruiser; Rare)
 Fi 167 (Condition Zebra; Torpedo Plane; Common)
 Fw 190A (Surface Action; Fighter; Common)
 Fw 200 Condor (War at Sea; Reconnaissance Plane; Uncommon)
 Friedrich der Grosse (Fleet Command; Battleship; Rare)
  (Condition Zebra; Battleship; Rare)
  (Task Force; Aircraft Carrier; Rare)
 Ju 87B Stuka (War at Sea; Dive Bomber; Common)
 Ju 88A-4 (Flank Speed; Bomber; Uncommon)
  (Task Force; Cruiser; Uncommon)
  (Surface Action; Cruiser; Uncommon)
  (War at Sea; Cruiser; Uncommon)
 M1 (Surface Action; Auxiliary; Common)
 Moltke (Surface Action; Battlecruiser; Rare)
 Nordmark (War at Sea; Auxiliary; Uncommon)
  (Condition Zebra; Cruiser; Uncommon)
  (Flank Speed; Cruiser Rare)
 Rheinubung Bismarck (Surface Action; Battleship; Rare)
 S-Boat (Task Force; Torpedo Boat; Common)
  (War at Sea; Battle Cruiser; Rare)
  (Flank Speed; Battleship; Rare)
 T27 (Flank Speed; Destroyer Escort; Common)
  (Task Force; Battleship; Rare)
  (Flank Speed; Submarine; Common)
  (Task Force; U-Boat; Common)
  (War at Sea; U-Boat; Common)
  (Fleet Command; U-Boat; Common)
  (Surface Action; Submarine; Common)
  (Task Force; Destroyer; Common)
  (War at Sea; Destroyer; Common)
 Z32 (Condition Zebra; Destroyer; Common)
 ZG3 (Fleet Command; Destroyer; Common)

 Greece
  (Condition Zebra; Cruiser; Rare)
 Proteus (Condition Zebra; Submarine; Common)
  (Condition Zebra; Destroyer; Common)

 Italy
  (Surface Action; Battleship; Rare)
 Antilope (Fleet Command; Corvette; Common)
 Ascari (Condition Zebra; Destroyer; Common)
 Ambra (War at Sea; Submarine; Common)
  (Flank Speed; Aircraft Carrier; Rare)
  (War at Sea; Cruiser; Rare)
 Camicia Nere (Surface Action; Destroyer; Common)
 C.202 Folgore (Task Force; Fighter; Common)
  (Condition Zebra; Battleship; Rare)
  (War at Sea; Cruiser; Uncommon)
  (Task Force; Cruiser; Uncommon)
  (Surface Action; Cruiser; Uncommon)
  (Task Force; Battleship; Rare)
  (Flank Speed; Cruiser; Uncommon)
  (Flank Speed; Cruiser; Rare)
 Ju 87 R2 Picchiatelli (Task Force; Dive Bomber; Common)
  (Condition Zebra; Submarine; Common)
  (Task Force; Battleship; Rare)
  (War at Sea; Destroyer; Common)
 Motor Torpedo Boat (War at Sea; PT Boat; Common)
 Pegaso (Flank Speed; Destroyer Escort; Common)
 RE.2001CB (Flank Speed; Fighter-Bomber; Common)
  (Fleet Command; Battleship; Rare)
  (Fleet Command; Cruiser; Rare)
 Scipione Africano (Fleet Command; Cruiser; Uncommon)
 SM.79 Sparviero (Task Force; Patrol Bomber; Uncommon)
  (Condition Zebra; Cruiser; Rare)
 Ugolino Vivaldi (Task Force; Destroyer; Common)
  (War at Sea; Battleship; Rare)
 Z.506B Airone (Condition Zebra; Patrol Bomber; Uncommon)
  (Task Force; Cruiser; Rare)

  Japan
 A6M2 "Zeke" (War at Sea; Fighter; Common)
 A6M2 Zero Kamikaze (Task Force; Fighter; Common)
 A6M2-N "Rufe" (Fleet Command; Seaplane Fighter; Common)
 A6M5 "Zeke" (Flank Speed; Fighter; Common)
  (Fleet Command; Cruiser; Rare)
  (Condition Zebra; Cruiser; Uncommon)
  (War at Sea; Aircraft Carrier; Rare)
  (Task Force; Destroyer; Common)
  (Flank Speed; Cruiser; Rare)
 B5N2 "Kate" (War at Sea; Torpedo Plane; Common)
 B5N2 Type 97 (Surface Action; Torpedo Plane; Common)
 B6N2 "Jill" (Flank Speed; Torpedo Plane; Common)
  (Condition Zebra; Cruiser; Rare)
  (Fleet Command; Seaplane Carrier; Uncommon)
 D3A "Val" (War at Sea; Dive Bomber; Common)
 D4YI "Judy" (Task Force; Dive Bomber; Common)
 Daihatsu Landing Craft (Surface Action; Landing Craft; Common)
 Elite A6M2 Zero (Surface Action;Fighter;Common) 
  (Condition Zebra; Battleship; Rare)
 G4M "Betty" (War at Sea; Bomber; Uncommon)
 G4M1 "Betty" (War at Sea Starter; Patrol Bomber; Uncommon)
 H8KI Type 2 "Emily" (Task Force; Seaplane; Uncommon)
  (Task Force; Battleship; Rare)
  (War at Sea Starter; Cruiser; Rare)
  (Surface Action; Destroyer; Common)
  (War at Sea; Submarine; Uncommon)
  (War at Sea Starter; Submarine; Uncommon)
  (Task Force; Submarine; Common)
  (Fleet Command; Battleship; Rare)
  (Task Force; Destroyer; Common)
  (War at Sea; Cruiser; Uncommon)
  (Condition Zebra; Aircraft Carrier; Rare)
  (Fleet Command; Aircraft Carrier; Rare)
 Kinai Maru (War at Sea; Transport; Uncommon)
  (Fleet Command; Battleship; Rare)
  (War at Sea; Battleship; Rare)
  (Condition Zebra; Destroyer; Common)
  (Surface Action; Cruiser; Rare)
  (Condition Zebra; Destroyer; Common)
  (Task Force; Battleship; Rare)
  (War at Sea; Cruiser; Rare)
 N1K1-J "George" (Condition Zebra; Fighter; Common)
  (Task Force; Cruiser; Rare)
  (Fleet Command; Destroyer; Common)
  (Flank Speed; Battleship; Rare)
  (Surface Action; Cruiser; Uncommon)
  (Flank Speed; Cruiser; Uncommon)
 Ro-50 (Fleet Command; Submarine; Common)
  (Surface Action; Aircraft Carrier; Rare)
  (Flank Speed; Destroyer; Common)
 Sho-Go  (Surface Action; Battleship; Rare)
  (War at Sea; Aircraft Carrier; Uncommon)
  (War at Sea; Aircraft Carrier; Rare)
  (Flank Speed; Aircraft Carrier; Rare)
  (Condition Zebra; Cruiser; Rare)
 T1 Landing Ship (Flank Speed; Auxiliary; Common)
  (Surface Action; Aircraft Carrier; Rare)
  (War at Sea Starter; Destroyer; Common)
  (War at Sea; Cruiser; Rare)
 Type 13 Subchaser (War at Sea; Escort; Common)
  (Task Force; Cruiser; Uncommon)
  (Task Force; Battleship; Rare)
  (War at Sea; Battleship; Rare)
  (War at Sea; Destroyer; Common)
  (Task Force; Aircraft Carrier; Rare)

 Netherlands
 Hr.Ms. De Ruyter (Task Force; Cruiser; Uncommon)
 Hr.Ms. Van Galen (Task Force; Destroyer; Common)
 Hr.Ms. Zwaardvisch (Task Force; Submarine; Common)
 Hr. Ms. Witte de With (Condition Zebra; Destroyer; Common)

  New Zealand
  (Flank Speed; Cruiser; Uncommon)

  Poland
  (Fleet Command; Destroyer; Common)
  (Surface Action; Cruiser; Uncommon)
  (Fleet Command; Submarine; Common)

  Soviet Union
  (Condition Zebra; Battleship; Rare)
 Gromkiy (Flank Speed; Destroyer; Common)
 IL-2M Sturmovik (Fleet Command; Attack Aircraft; Common)
  (Flank Speed; Cruiser; Rare)
  (Fleet Command; Cruiser; Uncommon)
 Oktyabrskaya Revolutsia (Flank Speed; Battleship; Rare)
 Lend-Lease Hurricane Mk. II (Surface Action; Fighter; Common)
  (Fleet Command; Submarine; Common)
 Sovetsky Soyuz (Fleet Command; Battleship; Rare)

 Kingdom of Sweden
 HSwMS Göteborg (Fleet Command; Destroyer; Common)
  (Fleet Command; Seaplane Carrier; Uncommon)
  (Fleet Command; Coastal Defense Ship; Rare)

  United Kingdom
 Beaufighter TF Mk. X (Task Force; Fighter; Uncommon)
 Barracuda Mk. II (Task Force; Dive Bomber/Torpedo; Common)
 Halifax Gr. Mk. V (Task Force; Heavy Bomber; Uncommon)
  (War at Sea; Cruiser; Uncommon)
  (War at Sea; Aircraft Carrier; Rare)
  (Flank Speed; Cruiser; Rare)
  (Condition Zebra; Destroyer; Common)
  (Surface Action; Aircraft Carrier; Rare)
  (Fleet Command; Cruiser; Uncommon)
  (War at Sea; Cruiser; Rare)
  (Task Force; Escort Carrier; Uncommon)
  (Fleet Command; Aircraft Carrier; Rare)
  (Surface Action; Minesweeper; Common)
  (Surface Action; Cruiser; Rare)
  (War at Sea; Battle Cruiser; Rare)
  (Task Force; Aircraft Carrier; Rare)
  (Task Force; Cruiser; Uncommon)
  (War at Sea; Destroyer; Common)
  (Task Force; Cruiser; Rare)
  (Task Force; Battleship; Rare)
  (Surface Action; Battleship; Rare)
  (Flank Speed; Battleship; Rare)
  (Flank Speed; Battlecruiser; Rare)
  (War at Sea; Battleship; Rare)
  (Condition Zebra; Battleship; Rare)
  (Flank Speed; Destroyer; Common)
  (Surface Action; Cruiser; Uncommon)
  (Fleet Command; Frigate; Common)
  (War at Sea; Submarine; Common)
  (Condition Zebra; Aircraft Carrier; Rare)
  (Task Force; Battleship; Rare)
 Martlet Mk. II (Flank Speed; Fighter; Common)
 Sea Hurricane Mk. IB (War at Sea; Fighter; Common)
  Short Sunderland Mk. I (Condition Zebra; Patrol Bomber; Uncommon)
 Supermarine Seafire (Fleet Command; Fighter; Common)
 Swordfish Mk. I (Surface Action; Torpedo Plane; Common)
 Swordfish Mk. II (War at Sea; Torpedo Plane; Common)
 Vospers MTB Torpedo Boat (Surface Action; MTB Torpedo Boat; Common)

  United States
 B-24 Liberator (Condition Zebra; Patrol Bomber; Uncommon)
 B-25H (Task Force; Bomber; Uncommon)
 F4F Wildcat (War at Sea; Fighter; Common)
 F4U-1A (Condition Zebra; Fighter; Common)
 F4U-1D (Surface Action; Fighter; Common)
 F6F-3 Hellcat (Task Force; Fighter; Common)
 P-40E Warhawk (Fleet Command; Fighter; Common)
 PBY Black Cat (Fleet Command; Reconnaissance; Uncommon)
 LST (Surface Action; Auxiliary; Common)
 PBY Catalina (War at Sea; Reconnaissance Plane; Uncommon)
 PT Boat (War at Sea; PT Boat; Common)
 SBD Dauntless (War at Sea; Dive Bomber; Common)
 SB2C Helldiver (Flank Speed; Dive Bomber; Common)
  (Surface Action; Transport; Uncommon)
  (War at Sea; Transport; Uncommon)
 TBD Devastator (War at Sea; Torpedo Plane; Common)
 TBF-1 Avenger (War at Sea Starter; Torpedo Plane; Common)
 TBF Avenger (Task Force; Torpedo Plane; Common)
  (Flank Speed; Battle Cruiser; Rare)
  (Condition Zebra; Destroyer; Common)
  (Task Force; Submarine; Common)
  (Flank Speed; Battleship; Rare)
  (War at Sea; Cruiser; Uncommon)
  (Fleet Command; Destroyer; Common)
  (War at Sea; Cruiser; Rare)
  (War at Sea; Submarine; Common)
  (War at Sea; Cruiser; Uncommon)
  (Task Force; Battleship; Rare)
  (Task Force; Cruiser; Uncommon)
  (Surface Action; Destroyer; Common)
  (War at Sea; Aircraft Carrier; Rare)
  (Fleet Command; Aircraft Carrier; Rare)
  (War at Sea; Destroyer; Uncommon)
  (Surface Action;Aircraft Carrier;Uncommon)
  (Flank Speed; Auxiliary; Uncommon)
  (Task Force; Destroyer; Common)
  (Surface Action; Aircraft Carrier; Rare)
  (Condition Zebra; Cruiser; Rare)
  (Flank Speed; Aircraft Carrier; Rare)
  (War at Sea; Battleship; Rare)
  (Task Force; Destroyer-Escort; Common)
  (Flank Speed; Destroyer; Common)
  (Task Force; Destroyer; Common)
  (Condition Zebra; Aircraft Carrier; Rare)
  (Task Force; Battleship; Rare)
  (Task Force; Battleship; Rare)
  (Surface Action; Battleship; Rare)
  (War at Sea Starter; Cruiser; Uncommon)
  (Surface Action; Battleship; Rare)
  (Fleet Command; Battleship; Rare)
  (Flank Speed; Battleship; Rare)
  (Flank Speed; Destroyer; Common)
  (Surface Action; Cruiser; Uncommon)
  (War at Sea; Aircraft Carrier; Rare)
  (Fleet Command; Cruiser; Rare)
  (Flank Speed; Cruiser; Uncommon)
  (Condition Zebra; Submarine; Common)
  (Task Force; Cruiser; Rare)
  (War at Sea; Cruiser; Rare)
  (War at Sea; Destroyer Escort; Common)
  (Flank Speed; Cruiser; Uncommon)
  (Task Force; Aircraft Carrier; Rare)
  (War at Sea; Escort Carrier; Uncommon)
  (War at Sea Starter; Destroyer; Common)
  (War at Sea; Battleship; Rare)
  (War at Sea; Battleship; Rare)
  (Surface Action; Aircraft Carrier; Rare)
  (Condition Zebra; Battleship; Rare)
  (Task Force; Aircraft Carrier; Rare)

Support Units
 Heavy Shore Battery Installation (Surface Action; Shore Battery; Rare)

References

External links
 Axis & Allies Miniatures Official website for Axis & Allies Miniatures at Wizards of the Coast.
 Axis & Allies.org An unofficial site dedicated to the World War II boardgames and miniatures games. This site features news, strategies, house rules, downloads, events, and active message forums.
 Wargaming Recon New England gaming podcast and blog focusing on War at Sea featuring Sneak Peeks, Pictures, Stats, and Analysis for fleet builds and gameplay.
 Axis & Allies Forumini One of the foremost discussion forums for Axis & Allies miniatures.
 Axis & Allies Forumini Wiki Established by the members of the Axis & Allies Forumini, this site contains reviews and histories of each unit, as well as pictures of each unit's card.
 Miniature Battle Guides This Site offers digital materials, score sheets, fleet ideas and Battle Guides for the War at Sea player.
 Complete list of all War at Sea Units with card images and including expansions published by the Forumini fan group.

Avalon Hill games
Axis & Allies
Collectible miniatures games
Miniature wargames
Wargames introduced in the 2000s